The Municipality of Šenčur is a municipality in Slovenia. The seat of the municipality is the settlement of Šenčur. The municipality was established in its current form on 3 October 1994, when the former larger Municipality of Kranj was subdivided into five smaller municipalities. The municipal holiday is celebrated on 23 April, St. George's Day.

Settlements
In addition to the municipal seat of Šenčur, the municipality also includes the following settlements:

 Hotemaže
 Luže
 Milje
 Olševek
 Prebačevo
 Srednja Vas pri Šenčurju
 Trboje
 Visoko
 Voglje
 Voklo
 Žerjavka

References

External links
 
Municipality of Šenčur at Geopedia
Municipality of Šenčur website 

 
1994 establishments in Slovenia
Sencur